Said (also Romanized as Saʿīd) is a village in Moshrageh Rural District, Moshrageh District, Ramshir County, Khuzestan Province, Iran. At the 2006 census, its population was 40, in 5 families.

References 

Populated places in Ramshir County